Stefanos Bastas (Greek: Στέφανος Μπάστας) is a Greek semi-professional rugby league footballer who plays as a  for Rhodes Knights in Greece. He began playing rugby league at the age of 18 in Greece with the Rhodes Knights. As of 2021, he is the most capped player for the Greek National Rugby League Team.

Career

Hemel Stags
Upon returning from Serbia, Bastas moved to England in search of a professional contract.  He attended trials and training sessions with the Hemel Stags, where he was successful and signed a one-year contract for the 2018 season. He was the first ever Greek rugby league player to secure a professional contract.

Doncaster RLFC
In 2019, following a series of trial games, Stefanos signed for Doncaster. He then scored his first ever try in Doncaster's 46-6 Challenge Cup win over Featherstone Lions.

Villegailhenc Aragon XIII
Bastas was released by Doncaster at the end of the 2019 season. He joined Villeghailhenc-Aragon XIII in the Elite Two Championship on 20 October 2019.

Saint-Gaudens Bears
On 8 Jan 2021 it was announced that Bastas has signed for Saint-Gaudens Bears in the Elite One Championship

Coventry Bears
On 7 May 2021 it was reported that he had signed for Coventry Bears in the RFL League 1

International
He was selected to represent the Greece national team in 2014 and was part of the squad that played in the European Championship Group C and also in the Balkans Cup.
In October 2017, at age 23, Bastas was named as captain of the national team ahead of the 2017 Balkans Cup.

He was also part of Greece's 2021 Rugby League World Cup qualifying campaign, in which they qualified for their first Rugby League World Cup.

References

External links
Greece profile
Greek profile

1993 births
Living people
Coventry Bears players
Doncaster R.L.F.C. players
Hemel Stags players
Greek rugby league players
Greece national rugby league team captains
Greece national rugby league team players
Rugby league props
Saint-Gaudens Bears players
Villegailhenc Aragon XIII players
Sportspeople from Central Greece
People from Karystos
Greek expatriate sportspeople in France
Greek expatriate sportspeople in England
Expatriate rugby league players in France
Expatriate rugby league players in England